The Cheruvally Devi Temple is located in the village of Cheruvally in the Kanjirappally taluk of Kottayam district, Kerala state, India. The presiding deity here is Goddess Bhadrakali, a more fierce form of Devi Aadishakthi. The temple is estimated to be at least thousand years old which is quite unique in its customs and traditions. The temple once under the possession of tribes later came in the hands of many landlords.

Location
It is located on the Ponkunnam - Manimala route.

Judge Ammavan
Govinda pillai was the Judge of Travancore Sardar court. Due to sudden rage caused by some misunderstandings he killed his nephew. Being a just person, he demanded (for gallows) the Maharaja to hang him to death. Later his Soul was settled here in his family Temple at Cheruvally. Installed many devotees conducted vellam kudi vazhipadu for success in legal cases and studies.

References

External links

 Video

Hindu temples in Kottayam district